Rafał Andrzej Kubacki (born 23 March 1967 in Wrocław) is a Polish judoka.

He is known from his role as Ursus (Lygia's huge bodyguard) in Quo Vadis (2001 film) directed by Jerzy Kawalerowicz.

He has also entered politics; first as a member of the "Samoobrona" ("Self-Defense Party"), he now represents Polish People's Party (PSL). He has been unsuccessful in his bid to be the president (mayor) of Wrocław.

Achievements

References

External links
 
 Homepage 

1967 births
Living people
Polish male judoka
Judoka at the 1992 Summer Olympics
Judoka at the 1996 Summer Olympics
Judoka at the 2000 Summer Olympics
Olympic judoka of Poland
Sportspeople from Wrocław
World judo champions
20th-century Polish people
21st-century Polish people